The Ward Gnome is a very small single seat sports monoplane, designed for amateur construction in the United Kingdom in the 1960s.  Only one is known to have flown.

Design and development

Michael Ward was a carpenter by profession and an enthusiastic aeromodeller.  In April 1966 he began the design of an extremely small single-seat aircraft, the Ward P46 Gnome, with one of the smallest spans (15 ft 9 in or 4.80 m) of any monoplane. It was intended for home construction.

The Gnome is an all wood low-wing monoplane, each wing braced from above with a slender strut to the upper fuselage longeron. The wood skinned wings, which are straight tapered and built around box spars and D-section leading edges, carry 2° of dihedral. There are wooden ailerons but no flaps.

The fuselage is built around four 3/4 in (19 mm) square longerons, with diagonal bracing and ply formers.  The skin is 1/16 in (1.6 mm) ply, with flat surfaces apart from curved decking. There is a single seat open cockpit.  The fixed tailwheel undercarriage has each mainwheel mounted on a pair of steel tubes forming a narrow 'V' and fixed under the fuselage.  Single bracing struts run forward from the wheel mountings to the lower longerons forward of the wings. Go-Kart wheels and tyres are used, without brakes. A two-cylinder, horizontally-opposed 14 horsepower Douglas motorcycle engine, built in 1925 and driving a two blade fixed pitch propeller, was the original powerplant though this may have been replaced later by a Sachs-Wankel motor.

The Gnome flew for the first time on 4 August 1967.

Operational history
The prototype Gnome was sold to a new owner who registered it as G-AXEI in April 1969 and flew it under a Permit to Fly.  The registration was cancelled in 1984.  At least one other Gnome was partially built, but never flown nor registered.

Survivors

The prototype, no longer airworthy, is currently with the Real Aeroplane Company at Breighton, East Riding of Yorkshire.  The unflown Gnome is on display at the Newark Air Museum, fitted with a Citroen 2CV engine.

Specifications

Notes

References

External links

 Ward Gnome G-AXEI

1960s British sport aircraft
Low-wing aircraft
Single-engined tractor aircraft
Aircraft first flown in 1967